The 1919–20 Drexel Blue and Gold men's basketball team represented Drexel Institute of Art, Science and Industry during the 1919–20 men's basketball season. The Blue and Gold, led by 2nd year head coach James Barrett, played their home games at Main Building.

During this season, in a game against Saint Joseph's, Stanley Twoes made a total of 20 free throws, setting a school record.

Roster

Schedule

|-
!colspan=9 style="background:#F8B800; color:#002663;"| Regular season
|-

References

Drexel Dragons men's basketball seasons
Drexel
1919 in sports in Pennsylvania
1920 in sports in Pennsylvania